is a city located in Chiba Prefecture, Japan. , the city had an estimated population of 136,023 in 63,431 households and a population density of 980 persons per km2.

Geography
Kisarazu is located in the midwestern part of the Bōsō Peninsula, approximately 30 kilometers southwest of the prefectural capital at Chiba and 70 to 80 kilometers from central Tokyo. The Tokyo Bay Aqua-Line, a bridge-tunnel across Tokyo Bay, connects Kisarazu and the cities of Kawasaki and Yokohama in Kanagawa Prefecture, shortening the road distance to central Tokyo to 30 to 40 kilometers.

The city area extends from east to west, and the western part of the city is the flat land of the Kanto Plain, and the eastern part is the plateau of the Kisarazu Plateau and the Boso Hill Range.
The Tokyo Bay coastal area is an industrial landfill from the south coast of Kisarazu Port to the direction of Kimitsu. The city's main river is the Obitsu River, which is the second longest river in the prefecture after the Tone River and has a total length of 88 kilometers.  There are no particularly high mountains in the city, and even the highest point is about 200 meters above sea level.

Neighboring municipalities
Chiba Prefecture
Ichihara
Sodegaura
Kimitsu

Climate
Kisarazu has a humid subtropical climate (Köppen Cfa) characterized by warm summers and cool winters with light to no snowfall.

Demographics
Per Japanese census data, the population of Kisarazu has increased substantially over the past 70 years.

History

Early history
The area of modern Kisarazu has been inhabited since the Japanese Paleolithic period, and numerous remains from the Jōmon, Yayoi and Kofun periods have been found within the city limits. The area also is prominent in the Yamatotakeru mythology. Under the Ritsuryō system of the Nara period, the area became part of Kazusa Province. The area was contested between the Later Hōjō clan,  Takeda clan and Satomi clan during the Sengoku period. During the Edo period under the Tokugawa shogunate, part of the area was under the control of the feudal domain of Jōzai, with large portions as tenryō territory controlled directly by the Shogunate and administered by numerous hatamoto.

Meiji Restoration and Kisarazu Prefecture 
Kisarazu was part of the complex reconfiguration of administrative areas at the start of the Meiji period. In 1871, as part of the abolition of the han system, the Sakurai Domain, located partly in Kisarazu, was abolished and "Sakurai Prefecture" was established.

In November of the same year, the prefecture was combined with the former Awa Province and Kazusa Province to form "Kisarazu Prefecture". The prefectural seat was established in the present-day Kaifusa district of Kisarazu. Kisarazu Prefecture was established two years later in 1873. It was combined with Inba Prefecture to form present-day Chiba Prefecture. Kisarazu Town, founded on April 1, 1889 with the creation of the modern municipalities system.

World War II and Post-War Period 
Kisarazu was developed as a center for military activity as part of the militarization of Japan in the 1930s. In 1935-1936 the Imperial Japanese Navy, established the Kisarazu Air Field for the Kisarazu Air Group on landfill in the northern part of Kisarazu to protect Tokyo from attack. The base served as an arsenal, and employed up to 17,000 workers during the war.  It was this site that received the remains of Admiral Isoroku Yamamoto after being transported back to Japan aboard . The Nakajima Kikka, Japan's first jet-powered aircraft, was tested at the base in 1945. The base was used by the United States Air Force from 1945 as "Kisarazu Air Base". In 1956, the base was officially transferred to the control of the Japan Air Self-Defense Force (JASDF).

On November 3, 1942. Kisarazu Town, Iwane Village, Kiyokawa Village, and Namioka Village marged to form Kisarazu City. Kisarazu was expanded through merger with neighboring Aoyagi Town on March 31, 1955, and again through merger with Amaha Town and Osawa Town on April 25, 1971.

Government
Kisarazu has a mayor-council form of government with a directly elected mayor and a unicameral city council of 24 members. Kisarazu contributes two members to the Chiba Prefectural Assembly. In terms of national politics, the city is part of Chiba 12th district of the lower house of the Diet of Japan.

Economy 
Kisarazu has a mixed economy based on commercial fishing, agriculture, and heavy industry along its Tokyo Bay shoreline. It serves as the commercial center for central Bōsō Peninsula, and is increasingly a bedroom community for neighboring Kimitsu and the Kawasaki – Yokohama metropolis across Tokyo Bay. The opening of the Tokyo Bay Aqua-Line has also resulted in the creation of a number of factory outlet shopping malls, and the development of new towns, and land prices increased dramatically in the 1980s through 2000s.

Transportation

Railway
 JR East –  Uchibō Line
 - 
 JR East – Kururi Line
 -  -  - ---

Highway

Seaports
Port of Kisarazu

Education
Seiwa University
 Kisazaru has 18 public elementary schools and 12 public middle schools operated by the city government, and two public high schools operated by the Chiba Prefectural Board of Education. The city also has one private elementary school, two private middle schools, and four private high schools.

Local attractions
Nakanoshima Park (Kisarazu)
Enmyō-in - Buddhist temple
Kōzō-ji - 30th temple in the Bandō Sanjūsankasho the circuit of 33 Buddhist temples in eastern Japan

Sister city relations
 Bogor, West Java, Indonesia, from November 18, 2016
 Oceanside, California,  United States, from June 29, 1990

Noted people from Kisarazu
Haruo Oka, musician
Hideki Takahashi, actor
Akira Nakao, actor
Kaori Fukuhara, voice actress
Miyuki Miura, karate master

In popular culture
Kisarazu's profile has been raised in recent times by the popularity of the TV show and subsequent film, Kisarazu Cat's Eye, which were set and filmed in the city.

Gallery

References

External links

Official Website 

 
Cities in Chiba Prefecture
Populated coastal places in Japan
Port settlements in Japan
Populated places established in 1942
1942 establishments in Japan